Selime İlyasoğlu (born November 18, 1988) is a Turkish volleyball player. She is 183 cm and plays as outside hitter. She plays for Galatasaray Daikin.

Awards

National Team
2011 European Championship - 
 2012 FIVB World Grand Prix -

Club
 2011-12 Turkish Cup -  Runner-up, with Galatasaray Daikin
 2011-12 CEV Cup -  Runner-up, with Galatasaray Daikin
 2012 Turkish Volleyball Super Cup -  Runner-Up, with Galatasaray Daikin
 2012-2013 Turkish Women's Volleyball Cup -  Bronze Medal with Galatasaray Daikin
 2017–18 CEV Champions League -  Runner-Up, with CSM Volei Alba Blaj

See also
 Turkish women in sports

References

1988 births
Living people
Turkish women's volleyball players
Galatasaray S.K. (women's volleyball) players
Turkish expatriate sportspeople in Romania
20th-century Turkish sportswomen
21st-century Turkish sportswomen